Colwellia agarivorans is a Gram-negative and facultatively anaerobic bacterium from the genus of Colwellia which has been isolated from coastal seawater from Qingdao in China.

References

Alteromonadales
Bacteria described in 2017